BOPA (Danish: Borgerlige Partisaner, Civil Partisans) was part of the Danish resistance movement during World War II.

BOPA may also refer to:

 Official Bulletin of the Principality of Andorra
 Bopa, a town, arrondissement, and commune in Mono Department, Benin